The 1919 Cal Poly Mustangs football team represented California Polytechnic School—now known as California Polytechnic State University, San Luis Obispo—as an independent during the 1919 college football season. Led by first-year head coach Herman Hess, Cal Poly compiled a record of 3–0 and outscored their opponents 103 to 6 en route to the team's first undefeated and untied season.

Cal Poly was a two-year school until 1941.

Schedule

References

Cal Poly
Cal Poly Mustangs football seasons
College football undefeated seasons
Cal Poly Mustangs football